Doumanani is a village and seat of the commune of Miria in the Cercle of Sikasso in the Sikasso Region of southern Mali. The village is 68 km northwest of Sikasso.

References

Populated places in Sikasso Region